Michel Devoret is a French physicist and F. W. Beinecke Professor of Applied Physics at Yale University. He also holds a position as the Director of the Applied Physics Nanofabrication Lab at Yale. He is known for his pioneering work on macroscopic quantum tunneling, and the single-electron pump as well as in groundbreaking contributions to initiating the fields of circuit quantum electrodynamics and quantronics.

Biography
Devoret was born in France. He graduated from Ecole Nationale Superieure des Telecommunications in Paris (1975) and went on to earn his PhD in physics from the University of Orsay (University of Paris-Sud) in 1982, while working in the molecular quantum physics group at Paris. After his doctoral work, he proceeded to post-doctoral training for two years, working on macroscopic quantum tunneling in John Clarke's laboratory at the University of California Berkeley.

Devoret's research has been focused on experimental solid state physics and condensed matter physics, with specific emphasis on circuit quantum electrodynamics and a field he and his colleagues initiated, known as "quantronics," the study of certain mesoscopic electronic effects in which collective degrees of freedom, such as electric currents and voltages behave quantum mechanically. In addition, his group has been carrying out investigations on single Cooper pair devices for fields such as quantum computation and metrology, and studying amplification, information, and noise in mesoscopic systems.

His work in association with well-known experimentalists in the field such as Rob Schoelkopf as well as theorists, such as Steven Girvin has brought about valuable insights in quantum computing and in developing a new paradigm of circuit QED using superconducting electrical circuits, which are now viewed as one of the main platforms for the implementation of quantum information processors. Also, after having developed new types of amplifiers reaching the quantum limit, he employed them to determine the fundamental back-action of measurements. In particular, Michel’s team showed that it was possible to stop a quantum jump in its flight and reverse it. He currently investigates the new phenomena of quantum error correction and fault-tolerant quantum operation. In addition, his work on quantum information, in association with A. Marblestone, has shown an exponential quantum enhancement in certain communication channels as a result of entanglement (see Quantum pseudo-telepathy).

In addition to a number of awards, he has been awarded the John Bell Prize (shared with Rob Schoelkopf) in 2013 for "Fundamental and pioneering experimental advances in entangling superconducting qubits and microwave photons, and their application to quantum information processing."

Honors
 Olli V. Lounasmaa Memorial Prize, 2016
 Fritz London Memorial Prize, 2014
 John Bell Prize (shared with Robert Schoelkopf), 2013
 Elected Membership, the French Academy of Sciences, 2007
 Professorship at the College de France, 2007-2012
 Europhysics-Agilent Prize, European Physical Society, 2004
 Elected Membership, the American Academy of Arts and Sciences, 2003
 Descartes-Huygens Prize, the Royal Netherlands Academy of Arts and Science, 1995
 Prize Ampère, the French Academy of Science, 1991

Noteworthy publications

References

External links
 http://qulab.eng.yale.edu/
 https://arxiv.org/abs/1605.00539

Yale University faculty
Living people
French physicists
Year of birth missing (living people)
Quantum information scientists